Friedrich Schütz (24 April 1844, Prague – 22 December 1908, Vienna) was an Austrian journalist and writer.

Schütz started his journalistic and literary career as Prague correspondent of the Neue Freie Presse. In 1873 he became editor of this newspaper.

Wolfgang Pauli, a famous physicist, was a grandson of Friedrich Schütz.

1844 births
1908 deaths
Austrian Jews
Austrian journalists
Austrian newspaper editors
Writers from Prague